The World Triathlon Winter Championships  is a winter triathlon championship competition organised by World Triathlon. The competition has been held annually since 1997. Unlike normal triathlon races the winter triathlon discipline takes place in snow-covered terrain. The snow therefore means the normal disciplines of swimming and road cycling do not take place, instead the championship typically involves running, mountain biking and cross-country skiing.

Venues

Medallists

Men's championship

Women's championship

Medal table

References

 
 

Triathlon, Winter
Recurring sporting events established in 1997
Triathlon world championships